The San Jose State Spartans men's basketball team represents San José State University in NCAA Division I college basketball as a member of the Mountain West Conference.

History

The SJSU men's basketball team played its first recorded game in 1909. The team has won 10 conference championships, appeared in the NCAA tournament three times, appeared once in the National Invitation Tournament (NIT), and twice in the College Basketball Invitational (CBI).

From the 1930s to 1976, the team played home games at the on-campus Spartan Gym. Starting in 1961, the team also played home games at the off-campus San Jose Civic Auditorium. From 1976 to 1979, the Spartans played their home games at Independence High School, as the Civic Auditorium was being remodeled. The team resumed play at the Civic beginning in the 1979–80 season. In 1989, the on-campus Provident Credit Union Event Center became the primary home for San Jose State basketball.

The Spartans first defeated a top-20 nationally ranked team in 1969 when they defeated No. 2 Santa Clara. Other victories over ranked opponents include wins over No. 5 Long Beach State in 1973, No. 14 Virginia in 1979, and No. 19 Alabama in 1996. 

The Spartans have spent a total of three weeks ranked in the Associated Press top-20 poll including one post-season ranking. 

Conference Championship Titles

California Coast Conference: 1925, 1928Far West Conference: 1929, 1931Northern California Athletic Conference: 1938California Collegiate Athletic Association: 1941 (co-champion), 1948, 1949Pacific Coast Athletic Association: 1980Big West Conference: 1996

Recent Coaching Hires

On March 29, 2013, San Jose State hired Boise State assistant coach Dave Wojcik to be the new head coach. Wojcik succeeded George Nessman, who was fired at the end of the 2012–2013 season. Wojcik resigned unexpectedly on July 11, 2017, for personal reasons, and assistant coach Rodney Tention was named interim head coach.

On August 4, 2017, San Jose State hired Colorado assistant Jean Prioleau. Four weeks later, forward Brandon Clarke, San Jose State's best player and reigning Mountain West Sixth Man of the Year award winner, transferred to Gonzaga. Clarke would eventually be a first-round draft pick in the 2019 NBA draft. Clarke's departure had an immediate effect on the team's performance, as the Spartans dropped to 4–26 (1–17 MW) in 2017–18 after compiling a 14–16 record in Wojcik's final season.

Prioleau was fired on March 12, 2021, after four seasons. He left San Jose State with a cumulative 20–93 (.177) overall record.

On April 6, 2021, San Jose State hired former Nebraska head coach Tim Miles to take over as head coach at SJSU. Miles arrived at San Jose State with nearly 400 career wins (399–334) and over 24 years of head coaching experience.

All-time Record vs. Current Mountain West Teams

All-time series records up through the  2022-23 season:

AP poll rankings

As of March 2023, San Jose State has spent three weeks ranked among the top–25 college basketball teams in the nation in the Associated Press college basketball poll. This includes one post–season top–25 ranking.

Postseason results
In five postseason tournament appearances up through the 2021–2022 season, the Spartans have yet to win a game.

NCAA tournament results
The Spartans have appeared in the NCAA tournament three times, with a combined record of 0–3.

NIT results
The Spartans have appeared in one National Invitation Tournament (NIT), and lost in the first round.

CBI results
The Spartans have appeared in two CBI tournaments. Their combined record is 1-1.

Spartans in the NBA

Twelve former SJSU men's basketball players have been drafted into the NBA.

References

External links